David Charles Bandy (born 19 July 1978) is an Australian first-class cricketer who played for Western Australia between 2005 and 2010. He played an allrounder who batted right-handed and bowled right-arm medium.

Bandy did not play for the Western Australian XI until the age of 27.

External links
 

1978 births
Living people
Australian cricketers
Cricketers from Perth, Western Australia
Western Australia cricketers
Sportsmen from Western Australia
21st-century Australian people